Isaie Tonye (born 27 April 1951) is a Cameroonian wrestler. He competed in the men's freestyle 74 kg at the 1980 Summer Olympics.

References

1951 births
Living people
Cameroonian male sport wrestlers
Olympic wrestlers of Cameroon
Wrestlers at the 1980 Summer Olympics
Place of birth missing (living people)